Roland Reid (born 13 September 1978) is a Scottish rugby union coach and former professional player. Born in Middelburg, South Africa, Reid also played Currie Cup rugby for Golden Lions and Boland Cavaliers. Reid could play at either flanker, Number Eight or  Wing.

Rugby Union career

Professional career

Reid began his rugby career in South Africa playing for the Golden Lions, between 1997 and 1999,

In 1999, he moved to Scotland and played for Glasgow Warriors where he regularly changed positions for the side.

Reid was with Glasgow until 2004, when he returned to South Africa to play Currie Cup rugby with the  during the 2004 Currie Cup Premier Division.

In season 2004-05 Reid moved to London Irish and the following season to Leeds Carnegie.

He played for the provincial side Boland Cavaliers in the 2006 Currie Cup First Division, where he helped them win the competition to gain promotion to the Currie Cup Premier Division.

Reid then moved back to Scotland where he played for Edinburgh until 2009, when he retired from professional rugby due to a persistent knee injury.

International career

Reid played for the South Africa U19 side.

Reid received his first full Scotland cap in 2001.

He also played for Scotland A and Scotland Sevens, which he helped win the World Cup Plate in March 2008.

Coaching career

While playing at Edinburgh, Reid gained a UKCC Level 1 coaching certificate.

He has a performance coaching business and a psychology degree from The Open University.

In 2013, he became the Assistant Coach for Scotland's Women Rugby side under Julie Maxton.

Family

Reid's father was from Greenock and thus he was already Scottish-qualified. Reid's great uncle Don Kitchenbrand had played football for Rangers in the 1950s.

References

External links

1978 births
Living people
Scottish rugby union coaches
Scotland international rugby union players
Glasgow Warriors players
Scotland international rugby sevens players
Male rugby sevens players
Rugby union flankers
Rugby union wings